Emilian Zabara is a Romanian sprint canoer who competed in the early 1970s. He won a bronze medal in the K-2 10000 m event at the 1971 ICF Canoe Sprint World Championships in Belgrade.
Born in Chilia Veche (22 January 1946 - 5 June 2016) in a small family of Ukrainian cossacks.
At his funerals were present some of his colleagues and life friends as Antrop Varabiev, Costel Coșniță, Ion Dragulschi and Atanase Sciotnic.

References

Living people
Romanian male canoeists
1946 births
ICF Canoe Sprint World Championships medalists in kayak